The 2009 Penn State Nittany Lions football team represented the Pennsylvania State University in the 2009 college football season. The team was coached by Joe Paterno and played its home games in Beaver Stadium in University Park, Pennsylvania. Penn State had the highest graduation rate among all of the teams on the Associated Press Top 25 poll with 89% of its 2002 enrollees graduating. Miami and Alabama tied for second place with a graduation rate of 75%. The Nittany Lions finished the season with an 11–2 record and won the Lambert-Meadowlands Trophy award to the best team in the ECAC for the 28th time and the second consecutive year.

Previous season
The 2008 season began with the Nittany Lions ranked #22 in the AP and Coaches preseason polls. The team was ranked as high as #3 in the AP and #2 in the Coaches polls prior to losing to the Iowa Hawkeyes 23–24. Despite the loss, Penn State were Big Ten co-champions with Ohio State and won the automatic BCS Rose Bowl bid due to Penn State winning the head-to-head matchup. After losing the 2009 Rose Bowl to the USC Trojans by two touchdowns, Penn State finished the season ranked #8 in both polls with a final record of 11–2.

Preseason
In December, backup quarterback Pat Devlin decided to transfer from Penn State and would not play in the Rose Bowl. Devlin appeared in ten games for the Nittany Lions, passing for 459 yards, four touchdowns and no interceptions. Devlin later committed to Delaware, a Division I FCS school, where he had two years of eligibility left.

In the Rose Bowl, backup tailback Stephfon Green left the game after sustaining what appeared to be a sprained right ankle. However, tests conducted after the team returned home revealed that Green sustained broken bones in his right leg and ankle and would require surgery to help repair the bones. Green was expected out of action for up to three months and would miss all of spring practice.

After the Rose Bowl, defensive line coach Larry Johnson, Sr. interviewed with Illinois head coach Ron Zook to become the Illini's defensive coordinator. While many anticipated Johnson to take the job, in the end Johnson decided to stay at his current position at Penn State.

In January, redshirt sophomore defensive end Aaron Maybin announced that he was skipping his final two seasons of eligibility and declared for the 2009 NFL Draft. Junior defensive end Maurice Evans, despite losing his starting position and playing time to Maybin due to a three-game suspension for marijuana possession, also declared for the draft.

In addition to losing Maybin and Evans to early entry, the defense loses its entire starting secondary to graduation. However, after redshirting the previous season due to injury, linebacker Sean Lee returns to the line-up for his senior season.

The offensive unit loses three-fifths of the offensive line to graduation including All-American and Rimington Trophy winner A.Q. Shipley. Also lost to graduation are the wide receiver trio of Derrick Williams, Deon Butler and Jordan Norwood, all four-year starters for the team. Paterno and the coaching staff also needed to find backups for returning starting quarterback Daryll Clark after losing backup Devlin to transfer and third-stringer Paul Cianciolo to graduation.

Sean Lee and Daryll Clark were named team co-captains for the 2009 season. Lee also served as a captain the previous season.

Recruiting class
The Nittany Lions received 27 letters of intent on National Signing Day, February 4, 2009.

Spring practice
The annual Blue-White scrimmage at Beaver Stadium was held April 25. The White squad defeated the Blue 21–16 in front of a record crowd of 76,500.

Senior quarterback Daryll Clark was 10 of 13 for 123 yards in limited duty for the Blue team against the first-team defense. True freshman Kevin Newsome led the White offense and finished 9 of 13 for 71 yards and one touchdown. In all, four quarterbacks on the two teams combined to complete 33 of 50 passes for 388 yards, four touchdowns and no interceptions.

Sophomore running back Brandon Beachum gained a game-high 38 yards on 10 carries. Junior Evan Royster led the Blue with 21 yards on just three carries in limited action.

Pre-season awards

Jeremy Boone
Second-team Phil Steele pre-season All-Big Ten
NaVorro Bowman
Second-team Athlon Sports pre-season All-American
First-team Athlon Sports pre-season All-Big Ten
Third-team Phil Steele pre-season All-American
First-team Phil Steele pre-season All-Big Ten
Second-team Sporting News pre-season All-American
First-team Sporting News pre-season All-Big Ten
ESPN.com pre-season All-Big Ten
ESPN.com pre-season All-American
Daryll Clark
First-team Athlon Sports pre-season All-Big Ten
Third-team Phil Steele pre-season All-Big Ten
ESPN.com pre-season All-Big Ten
Lou Eliades
Third-team Phil Steele pre-season All-Big Ten
Stephfon Green
Fourth-team Phil Steele pre-season All-Big Ten
Abe Koroma
Fourth-team Phil Steele pre-season All-Big Ten
Dennis Landolt
First-team Athlon Sports pre-season All-Big Ten
First-team Phil Steele pre-season All-Big Ten
Sean Lee
Second-team Athlon Sports pre-season All-Big Ten
Second-team Phil Steele pre-season All-American
First-team Phil Steele pre-season All-Big Ten
Jared Odrick
Third-team Athlon Sports pre-season All-American
First-team Athlon Sports pre-season All-Big Ten
Third-team Phil Steele pre-season All-American
First-team Phil Steele pre-season All-Big Ten
Third-team Sporting News pre-season All-American
First-team Sporting News pre-season All-Big Ten
ESPN.com pre-season All-Big Ten
Evan Royster
Second-team Athlon Sports pre-season All-American
First-team Athlon Sports pre-season All-Big Ten
Second-team Phil Steele pre-season All-American
First-team Phil Steele pre-season All-Big Ten
Second-team Sporting News pre-season All-American
First-team Sporting News pre-season All-Big Ten
ESPN.com pre-season All-Big Ten
A. J. Wallace
Fourth-team Phil Steele pre-season All-Big Ten
Stefen Wisniewski
Third-team Athlon Sports pre-season All-American
First-team Athlon Sports pre-season All-Big Ten
First-team Phil Steele pre-season All-Big Ten
Second-team Sporting News pre-season All-American
First-team Sporting News pre-season All-Big Ten
ESPN.com pre-season All-Big Ten

Schedule
Penn State does not play Big Ten teams Purdue and Wisconsin this year.

Personnel

Regular season

September 5: Akron

The Penn State defense did not give up a first down to the Zips in the first half as the Nittany Lions won 31–7. This game was not as close as the score. Backup linemen on both sides of the ball were slowly blended in during the second half while the key starters remained in until midway through the fourth quarter.

Tailback Evan Royster opened the scoring on a 5-yard run on Penn State's first drive of the game.  Chaz Powell later extended Penn State's lead to 14–0 with an 8-yard reception, his first career touchdown reception. Derek Moye led all receivers with six receptions for 138 yards and a touchdown. Graham Zug also caught a touchdown, and the Nittany Lions rolled to a 31–0 halftime lead and still won comfortably despite not scoring in the second half for the first time since a 13–3 loss at Wisconsin in 2006. Akron finished the game with 8 first downs and one touchdown late in the third quarter against a mix of backups and starters. Backup quarterback Kevin Newsome played in the final series along with other reserves and led the Nittany Lions down to the Akron 4-yard line.

Akron got its only points on a 40-yard pass to Deryn Bowser in the third quarter. Defensively, Penn State allowed eight net yards in the first half and 186 yards for the game. The Nittany Lions recorded 13 tackles for loss including four sacks. Safety Andrew Dailey snagged his first career interception, and senior linebacker Sean Lee made seven tackles including two for negative yardage in his first action in 18 months. Junior linebacker NaVorro Bowman left the game early with an injury, and his replacement, sophomore Nate Stupar made 12 tackles with a sack. Akron had just 28 rushing yards, which would be the fewest allowed by Penn State all year.

Senior quarterback Daryll Clark set career highs, going 29 of 40 for 353 yards. His 254 yards passing in the first half were a school record. For his efforts, Clark was named the Big Ten Co-Offensive Player of the Week.

September 12: Syracuse

Penn State won their second game of the year in a 28–7 win over Syracuse. Penn State scored early in the first quarter to go up 7–0 with a Daryll Clark pass to Evan Royster. Penn State nearly scored again early in the second quarter when faced with a 4th and 1, but Clark fumbled the snap to give Syracuse the ball near the goal line. Penn State would score on their next drive to go up 14–0 from a 12-yard run from Evan Royster, which would hold at halftime as Syracuse missed a long field goal. Penn State scored again late in the third quarter. Syracuse attempted to convert a 4th down with a pass, but it was dropped, preserving Penn State's 21–0 lead early in the 4th. Penn State scored once again midway through the 4th with a play action pass to Mickey Shuler to take a 28–0 lead. After getting the ball back, backup Kevin Newsome was subbed in along with other second string players, but a Newsome fumble gave Syracuse the ball with good field position, and they scored their only points against the Penn State second string defense in their only series of the game. Penn State recovered the onside kick attempt and ran out the clock with the backups still in. Matt McGloin also took a few snaps in his first college game, handing off to Brent Carter and Brandon Beachum.

Daryll Clark passed for 240 yards in a heavily pass-oriented game as Penn State only had 78 yards on the ground, 41 of those from Royster.

September 19: Temple

Despite several key players being sick with the flu, the Nittany Lions won convincingly over their in-state rivals, with the 25 point difference being their biggest of the season to this point. Temple became not only the first team to score twice on Penn State this season, but also the first team to not score a touchdown, continuing Penn State's streak of games versus Temple where the Owls scored no touchdowns dating back to 2003. Penn State managed a more balanced passing and running attack than in their previous two games.

Temple out-passed Penn State 205–173, but the Nittany Lions' defense didn't give up any big plays. The defense allowed only 46 yards rushing while Penn State had 186—their highest so far this season. Penn State had a 7–3 lead after one quarter, but Temple recovered an onside kick, changing the momentum of the game momentarily. Penn State's defense forced a three-and-out and the Nittany Lions coasted to a 21–3 halftime lead. Both teams scored a field goal in the third quarter, and Penn State scored a touchdown to bring the final score to 31–6.

September 26: Iowa

Penn State raced out to a quick 10–0 lead, but Iowa made some key adjustments that prevented Penn State from scoring for the rest of the game. The rain also played a factor in Penn State's inability to continue their pass-heavy gameplan from their first three games. Although Penn State controlled the first quarter, Iowa controlled the second (partly aided by Nittany Lion penalties). Iowa scored a safety with a sack of Darryl Clark in the end zone following a punt downed at the 6, and then scored a field goal, but missed a field goal right before halftime after a roughing the kicker penalty negated a three and out. Neither team would score in an equally controlled third quarter that had a slight edge in Penn State's favor, with Collin Wagner missing a 48-yard attempt for Penn State but the momentum soon changed. Penn State had to punt, and was clinging to a 10–5 lead early in the 4th, Iowa then blocked a punt and ran it back for a touchdown. Iowa's 2 point attempt failed, but they led by one point. With the momentum changed, Penn State's drive down the field ended in an interception. With the momentum on their side, the Hawkeyes drove down the field to increase the lead to 10–18. Penn State drove down the field following a huge kickoff return for a game-tying touchdown, but in the red zone, Evan Royster fumbled. The Hawkeyes recovered, and with 12 seconds left, kicked a field goal to prevent Penn State from winning in the final seconds from a possible Hail Mary and 2-point conversion. The final play of the game was a handoff to Royster. After the game, both teams found themselves ranked in similar positions, with the Hawkeyes 13/17 and Penn State 15/13 in ranking. Iowa was ranked #21 initially but after a close game with FCS Northern Iowa, they were unranked until upsetting Penn State. After the game, many Penn State fans expressed frustration over what they felt was the second consecutive year of "dominating Iowa for three quarters before losing", even though despite the longstanding lead, they only dominated the first 17 minutes of the game and a portion of the third quarter.

This is the last time Penn State was ranked in the Top 10 until 2016 season where Penn State was ranked No.10 on Nov 8, 2016.

October 3: @ Illinois

In a game not as close as the score, Stephfon Green and Evan Royster combined for 225 yards rushing as Penn State's rushing offense pounded away at the Illinois defense, running for a total of 338 yards and scoring all five of its offensive touchdowns on the ground. Green and Royster each scored a touchdown. In a slow first half, Illinois outgained Penn State 222–165 in the first half, despite this, Penn State held a 7–3 lead at halftime. The second half was a different story, as Penn State held the ball for 12:04 in the third quarter and outgained Illinois 208–8 in the quarter alone, Penn State scored a touchdown midway through the quarter, and would score another on the second play of the fourth. Penn State scored once again in the fourth, increasing the lead to 28–3. By that time the Illini had only 16 yards and no first downs in the second half, but with the backups starting to be subbed in, Illinois was on the move, and scored a touchdown midway through the fourth. Penn State answered with a touchdown of their own following an interception, with the second string offense subbed in, scoring on a 12-yard rush by backup Brent Carter on a pitch from backup quarterback Kevin Newsome that went for a touchdown to give Penn State their most points scored all year and a 35–10 lead. Illinois scored a touchdown with a Juice Williams keeper with 42 seconds left against the second and third string defense. Penn State recovered the onside kick and Kevin Newsome ran for a first down to run out the clock.

Quarterback Daryll Clark was of 25 for 175 yards, and also ran for 83 yards and two touchdowns, both in the second half of the game.

Defensively for Penn State, Josh Hull made 11 tackles, including one for a loss. Eric Latimore, Jack Crawford, and Sean Stanley were credited with a sack each. Stanley also forced a fumble that Jared Odrick recovered. Stephon Morris also snagged his first career interception at the end of the first half to prevent an Illini score, that was nearly run back for a touchdown. The first string defense also only allowed 16 second half Illini yards on three drives in the third and fourth quarter.

Third-string tailback Brent Carter scored his first career touchdown late in the fourth quarter to give Penn State its first touchdown from reserves this year.

October 10: Eastern Illinois

Starting quarterback Daryll Clark scored the first points of the game on a 1-yard touchdown run in the first quarter.  Colin Wagner added a chipshot field goal to extend the lead to 10–0.  In the second quarter, Brett Brackett scored on a two-yard strike from Clark.  Chaz Powell and Derek Moye also caught touchdown passes.

Eastern Illinois got its only points of the game on a field goal partway into the third quarter, but squandering two chances in the second.  Stephon Green then extended the Penn State lead to 45–3 with a 26-yard touchdown run.  Backup quarterback Kevin Newsome (who was 4/5 for 34 yards) scored his first career touchdown early in the fourth on a 9-yard run to make the score official. It was 52–3 after the score, Newsome would lead Penn State into the red zone again, but this time the result was a failed 4th down conversion rather than the field goal attempt. Matt McGloin also played in his second game this year and attempted his first career passes.

Many backups saw action for both teams. Penn State punted only twice throughout the game, both times were in the second half with backups in.  Regardless, Penn State still won by their most lopsided score of the year.

Defensively for Penn State, Josh Hull had 11 tackles.  A.J. Wallace also snagged an interception. Ollie Ogbu forced the fumble returned by NaVorro Bowman for a touchdown before the half, the first defensive touchdown for Penn State this year to already give them their most points all year at 38.

October 17: Minnesota

Penn State improved their overall record over Minnesota to 7–4 and held onto the Governor's Victory Bell once again. This was Tim Brewster's first game against the Nittany Lions, who did not play Minnesota in 2007 and 2008. Penn State scored two field goals early on and scored a touchdown on a pass that was initially called an incompletion but reviewed as a touchdown. Scoring one more touchdown in the third quarter, Penn State cruised to their first shutout since 2007 at Temple, where they won 31–0. Penn State's offense and defense dominated much more than what was reflected on the scoreboard, however. Minnesota had only 7 first downs and 138 total yards, most of which came from a long drive that went for no points due to a failed 4th down conversion on a 4th quarter goal line stand. At the end of the game, backup QB Kevin Newsome handed off a few times to kill the clock.

Penn State held the ball for 42 minutes of the game, their best since 1991. Penn State also had nearly 500 yards of offense in this game. In contrast, Minnesota had just 7 first downs, 138 yards of offense, 101 yards passing, and 37 yards rushing, their lowest in years. Collin Wagner made two field goals, but missed two more. Despite this, Adam Weber was only sacked once, escaping two more, and Clark was not sacked the entire game. This was also the first time Penn State shut out Minnesota, the previous best was 3 points in 1994, when Penn State won 56–3 on their quest to their first Big Ten championship, finishing 12–0 (8–0) and ranked #2.

October 24: @ Michigan

Penn State defeated Michigan in Ann Arbor for the first time since 1996, currently holding a two-game winning streak over the Wolverines. Daryll Clark threw for 230 yards and four touchdowns, three to wide receiver Graham Zug and a 61-yard pass to tight end Andrew Quarless. Clark became the Nittany Lions' all-time leader in touchdowns. The defense forced four turnovers, two interceptions, one by NaVorro Bowman and one by Drew Astorino and two fumble recoveries. Evan Royster also had over 100 yards rushing.

To start the game, Michigan drove down the field 70 yards and took a 7–0 lead, but Penn State responded and tied it up, then kicked a field goal late in the quarter. After a Penn State punt, a bad snap in the end zone led to a safety, and Penn State scored another touchdown to go up 19–7. Michigan managed a field goal right before halftime. Penn State scored two touchdowns (missing a two-point conversion the first time) in five minutes in the third quarter, then seemed to take their foot off the gas. At one point, Michigan blocked a Jeremy Boone punt, but they were unable to cash in, as Penn State's defense forced a fumble and got the ball back. A long drive, aided by a roughing the punter penalty, ended with Penn State's final points, a field goal. Michigan's final drive went deep into Penn State territory but was intercepted and returned to midfield.

October 31: @ Northwestern

Penn State mounted a second half comeback after trailing the Wildcats 10–13 at halftime and being tied 13–13 going into the 4th. Three touchdowns in less than four minutes in the 4th quarter enabled the Nittany Lions to pull away with two of the touchdowns happening on the first play from scrimmage in each drive.

November 7: Ohio State

Ohio State became the first team to score at least once in every quarter on Penn State this year, scoring a touchdown in three quarters, and a field goal in one. In what was a defensive battle for most of the game, called "Rope-A-Dope" football by the announcers, Ohio State pulled away late to win thanks to special teams. Despite the apparent laugher on the scoreboard, Ohio State only had 15 first downs and went 6–16 on third down, with their four scoring drives totalling only 178 yards. Penn State's defense also forced a sack on Pryor (recorded officially as a tackle for loss, although this "tackle for loss" happened during a pass play), but did not force any key fumbles, although Ohio State forced an interception after Penn State got good field position to attempt a comeback from 24–7 midway through the 4th quarter.

November 14: Indiana

After a slow start and quick 10–0 lead from Indiana, Penn State scored 10 points right before halftime to tie it up, then a pick six as Indiana was driving downfield put the Nittany Lions on top. They would score early in the 4th and then score once more late in the game following a Hoosiers field goal. Indiana would then score very late to make the final score respectable.

November 21: @ Michigan State

Penn State quarterback Daryll Clark passed for 310 yards and four touchdowns against Michigan State. He set a school record with 23 touchdown passes on the season and set the Penn State career record with 42. Running back Evan Royster gained 114 yards on 13 carries. Graham Zug and Andrew Quarless caught two TD passes each.

The teams were tied 7–7 at halftime before Penn State jumped to a 14–7 lead just over a minute into the second half with the help of a trick play: Wide receiver Curtis Drake threw a halfback option to Quarless for a 14-yard touchdown. Later in the third quarter, Clark connected with running back Joe Suhey on a 30-yard touchdown pass. Penn State safety Nick Sukay intercepted a Kirk Cousins pass on the next series, setting up the Nittany Lions at the Michigan State 32. Clark hit Zug in the endzone on the very next play, giving Penn State a 28–7 lead with 5:22 left in the third quarter.

The Nittany Lions would score two more touchdowns. The final one was Kevin Newsome's second career touchdown as both Newsome and Matthew McGloin had some playing time. and give up one on their way to a 42–14 victory, thus securing the Land Grant Trophy for another year and back-to-back 10-win seasons. Clark and linebacker NaVorro Bowman were named Big Ten Co-offensive and Co-Defensive Players of the Week, respectively. This was Penn State's biggest win ever in East Lansing.

January 1 vs. LSU

Penn State coach Joe Paterno got his record 24th bowl win and handed Les Miles his first loss in five bowls as LSU coach. A driving rainstorm turned the field into a mud bowl. Bad footing and dropped passes were normal in the first half, and PSU fumbled the snap exchange twice though both were recovered by the offense.  Quarterback Daryll Clark finished the game with 216 yards passing and one touchdown pass.  LSU signal caller Jordan Jefferson threw for 202 yards and a TD pass, however the Tigers were held to just 41 total yards rushing.  Collin Wagner's 21-yard field goal with 57 seconds left sealed the victory for the Nittany Lions.

Joe Paterno picked up his 24th career bowl victory, extending his own NCAA record. The Nittany Lions have won four of their last five bowl games.  The field took another pounding after poor conditions hampered the Champs Sports Bowl earlier in the week on the same turf. Eight state high school championship games were also played at the stadium in recent weeks, but the turf was replaced immediately after the high school championships, about three weeks before the Champs Sports Bowl.  The grounds crew worked frantically all week in an attempt to get the field in shape for the game.

The two-point margin was the only game this season for Penn State that was decided by fewer than 10 points.

Rankings

Awards

Watchlists

NaVorro Bowman
Lombardi Award watchlist
Bronko Nagurski Trophy watchlist
Bednarik Award watchlist and semifinalist
Butkus Award watchlist
Daryll Clark
Johnny Unitas Golden Arm Award candidate
Davey O'Brien Award watchlist
Walter Camp Award watchlist
Maxwell Award watchlist
Sean Lee
Lott Trophy watchlist
Bronko Nagurski Trophy watchlist
Bednarik Award watchlist
Lombardi Award watchlist
Butkus Award watchlist
Jared Odrick
Lombardi Award watchlist
Outland Trophy watchlist
Bronko Nagurski Trophy watchlist
Bednarik Award watchlist
Joe Paterno
Maxwell Football Club George Munger Award semifinalist
Evan Royster
Walter Camp Award watchlist
Maxwell Award watchlist
Doak Walker Award watchlist
Andrew Quarless
John Mackey Award watchlist
Stefen Wisniewski
Outland Trophy watchlist
Lombardi Award watchlist

Players

 Jesse Alfreno
Academic All-Big Ten
 Quinn Barham
Academic All-Big Ten
 Brandon Beachum
Academic All-Big Ten
Jeremy Boone
Big Ten Special Teams Player of the Week (Oct. 3)
ESPN The Magazine CoSIDA Academic All-District
Second-team All-Big Ten
Academic All-Big Ten
NaVorro Bowman
Big Ten Defensive Player of the Week (Nov. 14)
Big Ten Co-Defensive Player of the Week (Nov. 21)
First-team All-Big Ten
ESPN.com All-Big Ten
CBSSports.com second-team All-American
Sporting News second-team All-American
Rivals.com second-team All-American
Sports Illustrated second-team All-American
Phil Steele's College Football second-team All-American
Associated Press third-team All-American
College Football News third-team All-American
Pro Football Weekly honorable mention All-American
Brett Brackett
Academic All-Big Ten
Daryll Clark
Big Ten Co-Offensive Player of the Week (Sept. 5)
Big Ten Offensive Player of the Week (Sept. 24)
Big Ten Co-Offensive Player of the Week (Nov. 21)
First-team All-Big Ten
ESPN.com All-Big Ten
Chicago Tribune Silver Football (Big Ten MVP), co-winner
Pro Football Weekly honorable mention All-American
ECAC Player of the Year
 Chris Colasanti
Academic All-Big Ten
Josh Hull
ESPN The Magazine CoSIDA Academic All-District
Second-team All-Big Ten (media)
First-team ESPN The Magazine CoSIDA Academic All-America
Academic All-Big Ten
Dennis Landolt
First-team All-Big Ten (coaches)
Associated Press third-team All-American
 Kevion Latham
Academic All-Big Ten
Sean Lee
Big Ten Defensive Player of the Week (Sept. 19)
Second-team All-Big Ten
Big Ten Sportsmanship Award
Academic All-Big Ten
Pro Football Weekly honorable mention All-American
 Shelton McCullough
Academic All-Big Ten
Jared Odrick
First-team All-Big Ten (coaches)
Big Ten Defensive Player of the Year (coaches)
Big Ten Defensive Lineman of the Year (coaches)
ESPN.com All-Big Ten
AFCA All-American
CBSSports.com All-American
Associated Press second-team All-American
Rivals.com second-team All-American
Phil Steele's College Football second-team All-American
Sporting News third-team All-American
Pro Football Weekly honorable mention All-American
 Andrew Pitz
ESPN The Magazine CoSIDA Academic All-District
First-team ESPN The Magazine CoSIDA Academic All-America
Academic All-Big Ten
Evan Royster
First-team All-Big Ten
ESPN.com All-Big Ten
Mickey Shuler
Academic All-Big Ten
 Matt Stankiewitch
Academic All-Big Ten
 Nate Stupar
Academic All-Big Ten
Stefen Wisniewski
ESPN The Magazine CoSIDA Academic All-District
First-team All-Big Ten
First-team ESPN The Magazine CoSIDA Academic All-America
Academic All-Big Ten
ESPN.com All-Big Ten
College Football News third-team All-American
Pro Football Weekly honorable mention All-American

Other awards
2009 Lambert Trophy winner

Post season
Penn State finished the season ranked number 9 in the final AP poll and number 8 in the final Coaches poll, earning Penn State its 23rd Top 10 finish under Joe Paterno. It's the 35th final top 25 ranking under Paterno.

Following the Capital One Bowl, linebacker NaVorro Bowman announced he would skip his final season of eligibility and declared for the 2010 NFL Draft.

Four players were initially invited to the 2010 NFL Scouting Combine, held February 24 to March 2 in Indianapolis, Indiana: Jared Odrick, Sean Lee, Daryll Clark, and Andrew Quarless. NaVorro Bowman and Josh Hull were added to the list of combine invitations on January 29.

All-star games

NFL Draft

Notes 

 Penn State sets a brand new single season attendance record when 856,066 fans pack Beaver Stadium.

References

Penn State
Penn State Nittany Lions football seasons
Citrus Bowl champion seasons
Lambert-Meadowlands Trophy seasons
Penn State Nittany Lions football